The Cracksman is a 1963 British comedy film directed by Peter Graham Scott.

Plot
Charlie Drake plays honest but naive locksmith Ernest Wright who believes that everybody else is equally honest. First, he is duped by a debonair con man into opening a car. He is caught by the police but given probation. Next, the same man fools him into breaking into a house, and again he is caught while the villain escapes and he lands in jail. When he is released, he again gets tricked, this time by a woman, into opening a safe, for which he receives a three-year jail sentence. On arrival in prison, he has a reputation as a master thief. Upon his release, he finds himself as a pawn being manipulated by two gangs into a safe-cracking scheme but, with the help of undercover policewoman Muriel, he helps trap the crooks and clear his name.

Portions of the film satirise the 1962 films Birdman of Alcatraz and Dr. No, Drake's hit song My Boomerang Won't Come Back, and the Ceremony of the Keys at the Tower of London.

Cast
 Charlie Drake as Ernest Wright 
 Nyree Dawn Porter as Muriel 
 George Sanders as Guv'nor 
 Dennis Price as Grantley 
 Percy Herbert as Nosher Jenkins
 Eddie Byrne as Domino 
 Finlay Currie as Feathers 
 Geoffrey Keen as Magistrate 
 George A. Cooper as Fred 
 Patrick Cargill as Museum Guide 
 Norman Bird as Policeman 
 Neil McCarthy as Van Gogh 
 Christopher Rhodes as Mr. King 
 Ronnie Barker as Yossle 
 Wanda Ventham as Sandra 
 Jerold Wells as Chief Prison Officer 
 Tutte Lemkow as Choreographer 
 Richard Leech as Detective Sergeant 
 Robert Shaw as Moke

Additional credits
 Delia Derbyshire created the sound for the "In a Monastery Garden" sequence. The instrument is, in her words, "an E♭ safe-unlocking mechanism".

References

External links
 

1963 films
1960s crime comedy films
British crime comedy films
Films shot at Associated British Studios
Films scored by Ron Goodwin
1963 comedy films
1960s English-language films
1960s British films